Omobranchus verticalis, the vertical blenny, is a species of combtooth blenny found in brackish waters in Australia.  This species reaches a length of  SL.

References

verticalis
Fish described in 1975
Taxa named by Victor G. Springer
Taxa named by Martin F. Gomon